Atco is a train station in Atco, New Jersey on the Atlantic City Line. It serves NJ Transit trains, and the local 554 bus route.

Its Amtrak station code is ATO. Eastbound service is offered to Atlantic City and Westbound service is offered to Philadelphia. The station is near the site of what used to be a National Amusements Multiplex Cinema and the Atco Dragway, member facility of the National Hot Rod Association. The station is accessible from Route 73 and the White Horse Pike (U.S. Route 30).

Station layout

References

External links

Station on Google Maps Street View

NJ Transit Rail Operations stations
Railway stations in Camden County, New Jersey
Waterford Township, New Jersey
Amtrak Thruway Motorcoach stations in New Jersey